Ostrov is the first and only season of the Slovak version of Survivor. The show has 22 contestants competing in tribes of two who survive on an abandoned island, trying to survive nature and themselves. They compete in challenges where the losing tribe attends tribal council and votes one of their own out of the game. After 42 days, one will win a grand prize of €100,000 and win the title of Sole Survivor. The season premiered on 6 September 2016 and concluded on 8 December 2016 where Filip Ferianec claimed victory after winning against Viera Šestáková in a 8-3 jury vote winning the title of Sole Survivor.

Contestants
As a minor twist this season, amongst the contestants are sisters Kaja & Barbara Kowalczuková.

References

External links

Slovakia
Slovak reality television series
Television shows filmed in the Philippines
Markíza original programming